This is a list of flags used in the Slovakia to further history.

Current flags

State flag

Governmental flags

Subnational flags

Regional flags

Historical flags

Political flags

Ethnic Group Flags

See also 
 List of Czech flags
 Flag of Slovakia
 Coat of arms of Slovakia
 National symbols of Slovakia

References

External links 

 Slovakia Flag
 Zákon NR SR o štátnych symboloch Slovenskej republiky a ich používaní
 
 

Flags
Slovakia
Flags of Slovakia